John F. Sutton Jr. (January 26, 1918 - April 19, 2013) was an American lawyer and academic. He served as the A. W. Walker Centennial Chair Emeritus and Dean at the University of Texas School of Law. He was a fellow of the American Bar Association and a member of the State Bar of Texas.

References

1918 births
2013 deaths
University of Texas at Austin faculty
20th-century American lawyers